Garbagna may refer to two Italian small towns in Piedmont:

 Garbagna in the province of Alessandria
 Garbagna Novarese in the province of Novara

it:Garbagna